Tom Walsh (born 27 April 1999) is an English male professional squash player. He achieved his highest career ranking of 112 in February 2022 during the 2018 PSA World Tour which is also his current career singles ranking.

References 

1999 births
Living people
English male squash players
Sportspeople from Hemel Hempstead